Trapnall Hall is a historic house at 423 East Capitol Avenue in downtown Little Rock, Arkansas.  Built in 1843 for lawyer Frederic Trapnall; one of Arkansas's finest examples of pre-Civil War Greek Revival architecture.  It is a single-story brick building, with a hip roof and a projecting temple portico supported by square columns.  The building is now owned by the state, which uses it as an venue for public and private events.

The building was listed on the National Register of Historic Places in 1973.

See also
National Register of Historic Places listings in Little Rock, Arkansas

References

External links
Trapnall Hall web site

Houses on the National Register of Historic Places in Arkansas
National Register of Historic Places in Little Rock, Arkansas
Greek Revival architecture in Arkansas
Houses completed in 1843
Houses in Little Rock, Arkansas
Historic district contributing properties in Arkansas